The 2012–2013 Slovenian protests were a series of anti-establishment and anti-government protests. Protesters expressed disapproval with the country's ruling political elite, including Maribor mayor Franc Kangler, prime minister Janez Janša, and parliamentary opposition leader Zoran Janković (all of whom stood accused of corruption by Commission for the Prevention of Corruption).

Protests began on 2 November 2012 as the 2012–2013 Maribor protests against the city's mayor Franc Kangler and subsequently spread to other cities across the country, with protesters demanding resignations and prosecution of politicians and other members of the elite, accused of corruption.

Background
Government under the right-wing leader Janez Janša responded to the weakening of Slovenian economy during the global economic crisis and European sovereign-debt crisis with opening up old ideological fronts against liberal media, and against public sector - especially educational and cultural sectors, accusing them of being under influence of members of old regime (called Udbomafia and "Uncles from Behind the Scenes" (In Slovene: "strici iz ozadja")) and against everyone who doubted that austerity measures forced upon Slovenia are right ones.

In relation to the allegations made by official Commission for the Prevention of Corruption, Janša's party sent letters to the right-wing European Parliament members, discrediting the Commission's report as part of "the communist campaign that begun in 1983 with the aim to remove Janša from politics". Since Janša was ignoring the report and his party didn't offer any replacement for him, all three coalition parties and their leaders left the government within weeks and were subjected to ad hominem attacks by Janez Janša who accused the SLS's leader Radovan Žerjav of being "the worst (economics) minister in history of Slovenia", while the leader of the Civic List Gregor Virant has been mocked by Janša as engaging in "virantovanje" (a play on words with kurentovanje, a Slovenian carnival festival).

Reception

Reception by public intellectuals
The cause for demonstrations has been attributed by some public intellectuals to misunderstanding of post-socialist political elite who rejected "collectivism as socialist pattern" while, according to notable Slovene anthropologist Vesna V. Godina it is in fact a "pre-socialist pattern", originating from the way the traditional Slovene rural community was functioning much longer than in other – mainly Protestant and to much lesser degree in the mainly Catholic – modern nations, who have replaced traditional political culture earlier in history by the modern representative democracy and individualism.

Timeline

Notes
Note 1: The number of protesters is approximate, given by the media.
Note 2: The list includes only those who sought and received medical treatment.

See also
Trans-Universal Zombie Church of the Blissful Ringing
 List of protests in the 21st century

References

2012 protests
2013 protests
2012 in Slovenia
2013 in Slovenia
Slovenian
Protests in Slovenia